Peter V. White is an American film editor with more than 45 credits to his name, with the majority being television films.

Filmography

Editing

Producing

Acting

References

External links

American film editors
American Cinema Editors
Living people
Year of birth missing (living people)